Esther M. (Estie) Arkin is an Israeli–American mathematician and computer scientist whose research interests include operations research, computational geometry, combinatorial optimization, and the design and analysis of algorithms. She is a professor of applied mathematics and statistics at Stony Brook University. At Stony Brook, she also directs the undergraduate program in applied mathematics and statistics,
and is an affiliated faculty member with the department of computer science.

Education and career
Arkin graduated from Tel Aviv University in 1981. She earned a master's degree at Stanford University in 1983, and completed her Ph.D. at Stanford in 1986. Her doctoral dissertation, Complexity of Cycle and Path Problems in Graphs, was supervised by Christos Papadimitriou.
After working as a visiting professor at Cornell University, she joined the Stony Brook faculty in 1991.

Selected publications

References

External links
Home page

Year of birth missing (living people)
Living people
20th-century American mathematicians
21st-century American mathematicians
American women mathematicians
Israeli women computer scientists
Israeli computer scientists
Israeli mathematicians
Researchers in geometric algorithms
Tel Aviv University alumni
Stanford University School of Engineering alumni
Stony Brook University faculty
20th-century women mathematicians
21st-century women mathematicians
21st-century American women scientists
20th-century American women scientists
American computer scientists
20th-century American scientists
21st-century American scientists